Chad Crandell, born July 8, 1975 in Des Moines, Iowa, United States was a U.S. soccer midfielder who spent most of his career with the USL Second Division Wilmington Hammerheads.

Crandell attended Creighton University before transferring to Miami University.  In 1999, he signed with the Wilmington Hammerheads of the USL Second Division and spent his entire career with the team, except for the 2004 season when he played for the Des Moines Menace of the Premier Development League.

He enjoys the outdoors and likes skiing, cycling and fishing and his favorite TV show is CSI: Crime Scene Investigation. His favorite food is sushi. 

1975 births
Living people
American soccer players
Des Moines Menace players
USL Second Division players
Wilmington Hammerheads FC players
Creighton Bluejays men's soccer players
USL League Two players
Soccer players from Iowa
Association football midfielders